Yaka mein is a type of beef noodle soup found in many Creole restaurants  in New Orleans. It is also a type of Chinese wheat noodle.

The soup consists of stewed beef (such as brisket) in beef-based broth served on top of noodles and garnished with half a hard-boiled egg and chopped green onions. Cajun or Creole seasoning and chili powder are often added to the broth.

Culture and variations
Yaka mein is sometimes referred to as "Old Sober", as it is commonly prescribed by locals as a cure for hangovers. Vendors are common at New Orleans second lines, along with other settings including the New Orleans Jazz & Heritage Festival, alongside many other Creole and Cajun specialties. One of the major proponents of yaka mein since 2006 is Ms. Linda Green, who caters the dish at the Ogden Museum of Southern Art, JazzFest, Oak Street Po’Boy Fest, among other locations and cultural events in New Orleans. The soup is well loved by locals but not well known outside of the city and its surrounding region.

The dish is also found in Montreal, Canada, Norfolk, Virginia, Baltimore, Maryland, and Philadelphia, Pittsburgh, and Bellevue, Pennsylvania carry out restaurants. Some versions of Yaka Mein consists of thick wheat noodles (similar to udon) in a ketchup-based sauce or brown gravy, accompanied by thickly sliced onions, a hard-boiled egg, and fried noodles. Roast pork (char siu), chicken, and seafood can be added, with some restaurants including the option of pigs' feet.

Etymology

The phonetics of yaka mein is similar to the Cantonese pronunciation for "one order of noodles" (一個麵, Cantonese: jat1 go3 min6), a phrase commonly said by small restaurant waitstaffs to their kitchen to prepare an order of the restaurant's house noodle dish. However it is unclear if this is the origin of the name.
The dish is spelled in innumerable ways, all with phonetic similarities. A non-comprehensive list of these spellings includes:

Origins
The origins of yaka mein are uncertain. Some sources, including the late New Orleans chef Leah Chase, have claimed that yaka mein originated in New Orleans's now extinct Chinatown that was established by Chinese immigrants brought from California during the mid-19th century to build the railroads between Houston and New Orleans and work in the sugar plantations of the American South. It was during this period that the Chinese noodle soup adapted to local Creole and Chinese clientele.

Regardless of its North American origins, by the 1920s yaka mein was already known in other parts of North America. In a 1927 article published in Maclean's magazine, the author indicated that "yet-ca mein" consisted of noodles or vermicelli boiled in rich stock, divided into individual bowls and garnished with sliced hard-boiled egg and sliced and chopped cooked meats. The author also indicated that other noodles dishes served in disparate fashions may also be collectively known as yet-ca mein.

In the movie Whipsaw, from 1935, starring Myrna Loy, a character in New Orleans places a phone order with a Chinese restaurant for, among other things, Yaka mein. This mention supports the origin story cited by Leah Chase.

Noodle type

Yaka mein is also referred to as a type of dried wheat Chinese noodles. In Canada Yet Ca Mein was introduced in the 1950s by Toronto-based Wing's Food Products and Montreal based parent Wing Noodle Company (Wing Lung or Wing Hing Lung).

See also
 Chinese noodles
 List of regional dishes of the United States

References

Asian-American culture in Louisiana
Louisiana Creole cuisine
Chinese-American history
American Chinese cuisine
Noodle soups